Zakarpattia Oblast local election, 2010 was a local election in Zakarpattia Oblast that took place on October 31, 2010. Seats were split among eight political parties.

Results 

Chairman of the council elections
 Ivan Baloha (United Centre)

Uzhhorod city council

Mayor elections
 Pohoryelov (Eko +25) - 33%
 Ratushnyak (PPPU) - 24.26%
 Prykhodko (Party of Regions) - 13.5%

References

External links 
  Zakarpattia Oblast council official website
 Results of the 2010 local elections (Ukrainian pravda)
  Glavred analysis of the 2010 Ukrainian local elections (West)

Local elections in Ukraine
2010 elections in Ukraine
History of Zakarpattia Oblast
October 2010 events in Ukraine